Ernest Nsombo (born March 6, 1991) is a Cameroonian footballer who plays as a striker for USM Alger.

Honours
 USM Alger
 Algerian Ligue Professionnelle 1 
 Winner: 2013–14

References

Living people
1991 births
Cameroonian footballers
Les Astres players
Association football forwards
USM Alger players
Footballers from Douala
Expatriate footballers in Algeria
Cameroonian expatriate sportspeople in Algeria